Ansar Al-Mujahideen is a banned militant group operating in Pakistan. The group is affiliated to Tehrik-i-Taliban Pakistan. The group mostly carries out attacks against Pakistan Armed Forces and politicians, but has also threatened polio vaccination teams. Its members are largely Uzbeks and operate from North Waziristan.

Major attacks
16 Oct 2013: Israr Ullah Khan Gandapur, Provincial Law Minister of KPK was killed in a suicide bomb attack while greeting people meeting him, Ansar ul-Mujahideen claimed responsibility.
13 Oct 2013: The group claimed responsibility for the suicide attack on a convoy in Wana that killed two security officials.
18 Dec 2013: An explosive-laden truck hit a major security post in North Waziristan, killing five soldiers and injuring more than 20. The group claimed responsibility.

See also
Adnan Rashid
War in North-West Pakistan

References

Jihadist groups affiliated to Tehrik-i-Taliban Pakistan